Matt Goldman (born December 30, 1969) is an American record producer, audio engineer, mixer, and songwriter based in Atlanta, Georgia.

Biography 
Born in Spartanburg, South Carolina, United States, Goldman is a drummer by trade.  Goldman currently calls Glow in the Dark Studio in Atlanta home. The latest iteration of Glow in The Dark Studio is housed in the former location of renowned Cheshire Sound Studios, the first dual 24 track facility in the Southeast.

Goldman has worked with  Underoath, Copeland, The Chariot, As Cities Burn, Mychildren Mybride, Vanna, Cartel,  Meg & Dia,  Oceana, and more.

Select discography 
2003

 Casting Crowns, Casting Crowns (Beach Street) (E)

2005

 As Cities Burn, Son, I Loved You at Your Darkest (Tooth & Nail) (P/E/I/Prog)
 The Love Affair / Sonnet to Sleep, Sonnet to Sleep EP (Independent| South Pawl Records) (P/E/M)

2006

 Anathallo, Floating World (Nettwerk) (E/M)
 Underoath, "Define the Great Line" (Tooth & Nail Records and Solid State Records) (P/E)

2007

 Four Letter Lie, What A Terrible Thing To Say (Victory Records) (P/E/M)
 Meg & Dia "Mighty R-E-A-L" (Major League Soccer/Real Salt Lake/Dog House) (P/E/M)

2008

 Underoath, Lost in the Sound of Separation (Tooth & Nail Records and Solid State Records) (P/E)

2009

 Four Letter Lie, A New Day (Victory Records) (P/E/M)
 The Chariot, Wars and Rumors of Wars (Tooth & Nail) (P/E/M)

2010

 Eagle Scout, New Hands (P/E/M)
 Underoath, Ø (Disambiguation)  (Tooth and Nail Records) (P/E)
 Oceana, Clean Head (Rise Records) (P/E/M)

2011

 Becoming the Archetype, Celestial Completion (Solid State Records) (P/E/M)
 Vanna, And They Came Baring Bones (Artery Recordings) (P/E/M)
 Dinner and a Suit, "Since Our Departure"

2012

 The Chariot One Wing (Good Fight Records) (P/E/M)
 Thera From The North EP (Independent) (P/E/M)

 2013

 The Devil Wears Prada, 8:18 (Roadrunner) (P/E)
 My Epic, Behold (P/E/M)

 2014

 Anberlin, Lowborn (Tooth & Nail) (E)
 '68, In Humor and Sadness (eOne) (P/E/M)

 2015

 Haste the Day, Coward (Solid State Records)
 John Coffey, The Great News (V2 Records) (P/E/M)
 Belle Haven, Everything Ablaze (Halfcut Records)
 Foreveratlast, Ghosts Again (Victory Records)

 2016

 Sherwood, Some Things Never Leave You (BC Music) (M)
 SayWeCanFly, Blessed Ar Those (Epitaph) (M)

 2017

 Tigerwine, Die With Your Tongue Out (Blood and Ink) (P/E/M)
 '68, Two Parts Viper (Cooking Vinyl) (P/E/M)

References

External links
 
 

1969 births
Living people
Songwriters from South Carolina
Record producers from South Carolina
Musicians from Spartanburg, South Carolina
20th-century American drummers
American male drummers
20th-century American male musicians
American male songwriters